Simone Briese-Baetke (born 2 April 1966 Wittstock) is a German wheelchair fencer in épée, foil and saber. She won a silver medal at the paralympics.

On 7 November 2012, she received the Silver Laurel Leaf.

Career 
She suffers from multiple sclerosis and is paraplegic. She started her sporting career at TUS Makkabi Rostock. She later moved to the Tauberbischofsheim fencing club.

Briese-Baetke fences with épée, foil and saber and is a multiple World Cup winner, European champion in 2009 with épée, bronze medalist in 2010 and 2011 at the World Championships.

At the 2012 Summer Paralympics in London, she won the silver medal in Women's Épée Individual Cat. B. She competed in Women's Foil Individual Cat. B,

At the 2013 World Championships in Budapest, she only lost in the foil semifinals to 2012 Paralympic champion Yao Fang with 6:15 and received the bronze medal.

At the 2016 Summer Paralympics in Rio de Janeiro, she competed in Women's Individual Épée Cat. B, and Women's Individual Foil Cat. B.

References

External links 

 Simone Briese-Baetke (R) of Germany versus Yui Chong Chan of Hong Kong during the Rio 2016 Paralympic Games, 13 September 2016. Photo: Kay Nietfeld/dpa (
 Briese-Baetke verpasst Medaille

1966 births
Paralympic silver medalists for Germany
Living people
Paralympic wheelchair fencers of Germany
German female fencers
Wheelchair fencers at the 2012 Summer Paralympics
Medalists at the 2012 Summer Paralympics
Wheelchair fencers at the 2016 Summer Paralympics